The Duncan Ridge Trail is a hiking trail that has been designated as a National Recreation Trail in Georgia.  The trail is 35.5 miles (53.25 km.) long and traverses mountains, descends into valleys and features scenic viewpoints and waterfalls.  It is located in the Chattahoochee National Forest and is maintained by the U.S. Forest Service in the Brasstown and Toccoa Ranger Districts.

The Duncan Ridge Trail starts at an intersection with the Benton MacKaye Trail and the Appalachian Trail at Long Creek and crosses the Toccoa River on a  swinging bridge.  The eastern end of the trail combines with the Coosa Backcountry Trail and ultimately ends in the Blood Mountain Wilderness, where it reconnects with the Appalachian Trail.  Long Creek Falls is a waterfall that is accessible from the Duncan Ridge Trail.

External links
Duncan Ridge Trail entry in the National Recreation Trails Database
Duncan Ridge Trail website maintained by the Chattahoochee-Oconee National Forest

Protected areas of Fannin County, Georgia
Hiking trails in Georgia (U.S. state)
National Recreation Trails in Georgia (U.S. state)
Protected areas of Union County, Georgia
Chattahoochee-Oconee National Forest
Long-distance trails in the United States